They aren't really much to say in the Sweden year 1613 but they're also can talk, such as the end of Kalmar war such a Treaty of Knared 

Events from the year 1613 in Sweden

Incumbents
 Monarch – Gustaf II Adolf

Events

 - Treaty of Knäred

Births

 - Carl Gustaf Wrangel, military commander and politician  (died 1676) 
 - Malin Matsdotter, alleged witch  (died 1676)

Deaths 

 - Sigrid Sture
 
 
 
 - Karin Nilsdotter, royal lover  (born 1551)

References

 
Years of the 17th century in Sweden
Sweden